Leon Clarence Brinkopf (October 20, 1926 – July 2, 1998) was a right-handed shortstop in Major League Baseball for the Chicago Cubs in 1952.

Brinkopf was originally signed by the St. Louis Browns in 1944 but found himself released a year later. He made his way to the Chicago Cubs' farm system after they acquired him from his independent minor league team in Dallas, Texas in exchange for former Cub big-leaguer Roy Easterwood. Brinkopf debuted with the Cubs on April 18, 1952 and appeared in a total of nine games, including his final big-league contest on May 5. The sum of his Major League Baseball experience was four hits (all singles) in 22 at-bats (a .182 batting average), 2 RBI and a run scored.

Brinkopf died on July 2, 1998 in his birthplace of Cape Girardeau, Missouri.

References

Major League Baseball shortstops
Chicago Cubs players
Des Moines Bruins players
Nashville Vols players
Newark Moundsmen players
Odessa Oilers players
Los Angeles Angels (minor league) players
Shreveport Sports players
Baseball players from Missouri
Sportspeople from Cape Girardeau, Missouri
1926 births
1998 deaths